Coriona Kear Ware Corfield is a radio broadcaster and producer known especially for her newsreading and continuity announcements on BBC Radio 4.

Early life and education
She was born 1961 in Oxford.  Raised near Stratford-upon-Avon, Corfield was educated at Stratford-upon-Avon Grammar School for Girls, where she became Head Girl.  She then read English and Drama at Goldsmiths, University of London

Broadcasting career
She joined the BBC as a studio manager in 1983 with the World Service. In 1987 she worked at the new BBC 648, and also became a newsreader for the World Service and read the news on Radio 4 from 1988.

Between 1991 and 1995 she lived in South Africa, where she worked at Radio 702. She also worked as a producer for the Canadian Broadcasting Corporation. She returned to Radio 4 in 1995.

Over a period from late 2010, with colleague Kathy Clugston, Corfield persuaded broadcasters connected with Radio 4 to don the 'slanket of con', a garment purportedly worn by continuity announcers in the air-conditioned chill of studio 40B as they read the late night shipping bulletin, and has photographed the wearers in various comic poses. The garment has since been sold.

In 2016, she placed seventh in a Radio Times poll of the top voices on UK radio.

She read the Six O'Clock News for the last time on BBC Radio 4 on 23 February 2021.

References

External links
 Corrie Corfield BBC Radio 4 
 Slanket of Con
 Independent September 2003
 

1961 births
Living people
Alumni of Goldsmiths, University of London
BBC newsreaders and journalists
BBC World Service people
BBC Radio 4
People educated at Stratford-upon-Avon Grammar School for Girls
People from Stratford-upon-Avon
Radio and television announcers